The Leeds municipal elections were held on Thursday 11 May 1961, with one third of the council and a vacancy in Cross Gates up for election.

In contrast to the national picture, the results in Leeds were a mirror-image of the previous year's election, with Labour enjoying a 5.5% swing in their direction, enabling them to win the majority of seats - defending all but one. The sole seat that changed hands, was the Conservative's gain in Wortley - returning the ward to full Conservative representation after a decade of mixture.

The Liberals, now including the unsuccessful Independent of the year before, retained their second place comfortably in Far Headingley and - by contrast - just three votes in Allerton. The Communists fielded a record of six candidates, gaining them their highest share on record, and highest vote since 1947. The BNP also entered their first ever candidate in Leeds, receiving 4% in Armley.

In addition, the allocation of aldermen changed, in accordance to the long running agreement between Labour and the Conservatives that they should be divided up proportional to their councillors - roughly one alderman per three councillors - granting the Tories an extra two at Labour's expense. All of which resulted in Labour's majority amounting to fourteen. Turnout returned to the mid thirties (35.6%) where it had stabilised for the latter half of the former decade, until suffering a sharp drop at the last election.

Election result

The result had the following consequences for the total number of seats on the council after the elections:

Ward results

References

1961 English local elections
1961
1960s in Leeds